The Women's individual normal hill competition at the FIS Nordic World Ski Championships 2021 was held on 25 February. A qualification was held on 24 February 2021.

Results

Qualification
The qualification was started on 24 February at 18:00.

Final
The first round was started on 25 February at 17:00 and the final round at 17:55.

References

Women's individual normal hill